Karin Johansson, (born 1986) is a Swedish sprint canoer who has competed since the late 2000s. She won a bronze medal in the K-4 200 m event at the 2006 ICF Canoe Sprint World Championships in Szeged. Her home club is Örebro KF.

References

Svenska kanotförbundet: Landslagsaktiva 

Living people
Swedish female canoeists
1986 births
Canoeists at the 2012 Summer Olympics
Canoeists at the 2016 Summer Olympics
Olympic canoeists of Sweden
ICF Canoe Sprint World Championships medalists in kayak
Canoeists at the 2015 European Games
European Games competitors for Sweden